Travis Deonte James Rudolph (born September 15, 1995) is an American football wide receiver who is a free agent. He played college football at Florida State, and has previously played for the New York Giants and Miami Dolphins of the National Football League (NFL).

Early years
Rudolph attended Cardinal Newman High School in West Palm Beach, Florida. As a senior, he had 63 receptions for school records 1,237 yards and 15 touchdowns. Rudolph was rated by Rivals.com as a five-star recruit and was ranked as the number one receiver in his class. He committed to Florida State University to play college football.

College career
As a true freshman at Florida State in 2014, Rudolph played in 13 games with six starts and had 38 receptions for 555 yards and four touchdowns. In his second season at Florida State, Rudolph played 13 games with 11 starts. He led the team in receptions (59), receiving yards (916), and touchdown receptions (7). In the 2015 Peach Bowl, he caught 7 receptions for 201 yards, both career-highs in catches and receiving yards. This performance also broke the record for most receiving yards by a Seminole in bowl history, breaking Javon Walker's record of 195 receiving yards set during the 2002 Gator Bowl. As a junior in 2016, Rudolph played 13 games with 840 receiving yards and seven touchdowns. After the season, Rudolph decided to forgo his senior year and enter the 2017 NFL Draft.

Professional career

New York Giants
Rudolph signed with the New York Giants as an undrafted free agent following the 2017 NFL Draft. He was waived on September 2, 2017 and was signed to the Giants' practice squad the next day. He was promoted to the active roster on October 9, 2017 after injuries to multiple receivers on the team. Rudolph recorded his first NFL reception in a Week 7 game against the Seattle Seahawks on October 22, 2017. Rudolph finished the game with 3 receptions for 32 yards.

On September 1, 2018, Rudolph was waived by the Giants.

Miami Dolphins
Rudolph was signed to the Miami Dolphins practice squad on October 10, 2018, however he suffered a torn ACL in his first day of practice and was placed on the practice squad/injured list.

Winnipeg Blue Bombers
Rudolph signed with the Winnipeg Blue Bombers of the Canadian Football League on January 6, 2020. He was released on April 7, 2021.

Personal life
In August 2016, while visiting a middle school in Tallahassee with other FSU players, Rudolph made national headlines after he sat and ate lunch with Bo Paske, an autistic student who was eating by himself.

In April 2017, days before the 2017 NFL Draft, Rudolph's father, Darryl, was shot and killed while working as a maintenance worker at a strip club in West Palm Beach, Florida. Police said Darryl Rudolph was working in a back storage room when a coworker, in an adjacent room, accidentally discharged a rifle while moving it off a shelf. The bullet traveled through the wall and struck Darryl in the neck.

Rudolph is a cousin of former NFL wide receiver and return specialist Devin Hester.

Murder charge
On April 7, 2021, Rudolph was arrested in Palm Beach County, Florida, and charged with one count of first-degree murder and three counts of attempted first-degree murder. According to investigator's from the Palm Beach County Sheriff’s Office, Rudolph allegedly opened fire on four attackers whom assaulted him at his home after a dispute with Rudolph at his mother’s house in Lake Park. One person was killed and another was wounded as a result. Rudolph was initially held in jail without bond. 

Rudolph’s defense team filed a motion to dismiss all charges under Florida’s Stand Your Ground Law. The motion was subsequently denied by a judge in March of 2022.

Less than one month later, Rudolph’s attorney negotiated his release from jail on $160,000 cash bond. The agreement requires Rudolph to remain on house arrest. Rudolph is currently awaiting trial.

References

External links
Florida State Seminoles bio

1995 births
Living people
Sportspeople from West Palm Beach, Florida
Players of American football from Florida
American football wide receivers
Florida State Seminoles football players
New York Giants players
Miami Dolphins players
Winnipeg Blue Bombers players